Raymond Lane may refer to:

 Raymond Aloysius Lane (1894–1974), American Roman Catholic missionary and bishop
 Raymond J. Lane (born 1946), American business executive and strategist
 Raymond Lane Jr., sculptor

See also
Ray Lane (disambiguation)